The Marching 101 is the official name of the marching band at South Carolina State University in Orangeburg, South Carolina. The current director of the band is Dr. Patrick Moore.

History
The marching band began in 1918 as a regimental band performing military drills and assisting with music at Sunday schools. The band evolved from a service band to a part of the school’s Department of Music. In the fall of 1964 the band debuted its new name, The SC State Marching 101 Band.

Appearances
"The 101 makes appearances across the country, from its representation of South Carolina State to bowl parades to NFL games, and the band has made its mark, winning Atlanta’s annual Honda Battle of the Bands competition in 2011 and 2014. So acclaimed is the band’s reputation, the 101 was featured last October in the VH1 movie Drumline: A New Beat. The character Dr. James Lee from the original film was inspired by former South Carolina State band directors."

Rivalries

The Marching 101 maintains a fierce rivalry with Florida A&M University's Marching 100.  In addition to competing on the field during the annual football meeting between the two schools, the Marching 101 and Marching 100 compete off the field as well holding their own Battle of the Bands competition versus each other. Other rivalries include the North Carolina A & T University "Blue & Gold Marching Machine."

Band director lineage
 William H. Jackson, 1918-1924
 Fred Bugard Payton, 1924-1928
 Harold June (student), 1928-1931
 Earl Davis, 1931-1934
 Reginald Thomasson, 1934-1943, 1949-1976
 C. V. Troupe, 1943-1966
 Marcus Rowland, 1966-1967
 Clifford Watkins, 1967-1971
 Edwin Hughes, 1971-1973
 James Sochinski, 1973-1975
 Issac Richardson, 1975-1976
 Ronald J Sarjeant, 1976-2004
 Eddie Ellis, 2004-2015
 John Robinson, 2015-2017
 Patrick Moore, 2018-present

Primary repertoire
The Marching 101 primary repertoire includes the following:

"Bulldog Fight Song"
"Get Up for the Bulldogs", inspired by "Up for the Down Stroke" from Parliament (band)
"Pass the Peas", a 1972 classic by The J.B.'s
"South Carolina State University Alma Mater" (Alma Mater)

Summer band camp
The Marching 101's School Summer Band Camp offers a one-week intensive camp where campers condition, practice, and perform like the Marching 101, putting on an exhibition performance at the end of the week.

Community outreach
The South Carolina State University community believes involvement and community outreach is critical to the success of the university and the Marching 101.  The outreach program provides two free lessons on a particular instrument from members of the 101 and the Bulldog community.

References

South Carolina State University
Mid-Eastern Athletic Conference marching bands
South Carolina State Bulldogs football
1918 establishments in South Carolina
Musical groups established in 1918